Franck Tayou (born April 16, 1990) is a Cameroon-born-American soccer player who currently plays for the Empire Strykers of the Major Arena Soccer League.

Career
Tayou began his college soccer career at West Virginia University in 2010 where he played for two years, leading the Mountaineers to the NCAA tournament in both seasons. Tayou has had a successful career playing indoor soccer in the Major Arena Soccer League. He is a 4-time MASL MVP, with his first vote for Most Valuable Player coming in the 2015/2016 MASL, after an outstanding season with Mexican club Soles de Sonora, whom he led to the Ron Newman Cup final. They eventually lost to the Baltimore Blast. He led the league with 47 goals and 62 points in 20 games. He was also the leading goal scorer of the playoff series.
 
Tayou has represented the US Futsal National team in the Umag Nations Cup in Croatia in 2022, as well as the CONCACAF tournament which took place in Costa Rica. He has also represented the United States in futsal and arena soccer.

Tayou has played with numerous Premier Development League sides, including Real Maryland Monarchs, NJ-LUSO Parma, Northern Virginia Royals and Las Vegas Mobsters. Tayou signed with United Soccer League side San Antonio FC on June 16, 2016. On June 16, 2017, Tayou signed with the Richmond Kickers of the USL. After a spell with NPSL side FC Wichita, Tayou joined USL club Fresno FC on June 15, 2018. 

Along with his outdoor soccer experience, Tayou has built an incredible resume in the Major Arena Soccer League, where he has played indoor soccer professionally with Las Vegas Legends, Tulsa Revolution and Soles de Sonora. He has won four MASL Most Valuable Player Awards and scored 323 goals in just 152 games.

In May 2021, Franck and his brother Uzi joined the Wichita Wings for the remainder of the Major Arena Soccer League 2 season.

Honors
Individual
MASL MVP(4): 2015-16, 2016-17, 2017-18, 2019-20
All-MASL First Team: 2015-16, 2016-17, 2017-18, 2019-20
All-MASL Second Team: 2018-19
Ed Tepper Humanitarian of the Year: 2018-19

References

External links 
 
 
 

1990 births
Living people
American soccer players
West Virginia Mountaineers men's soccer players
Real Maryland F.C. players
NJ-LUSO Parma players
Northern Virginia Royals players
Tulsa Revolution players
Las Vegas Mobsters players
San Antonio FC players
Richmond Kickers players
Fresno FC players
Association football forwards
Soccer players from Nevada
USL League Two players
Professional Arena Soccer League players
Major Arena Soccer League players
USL Championship players
Cameroonian emigrants to the United States
Monterrey Flash players
Sportspeople from Las Vegas
Oxford City FC of Texas players
FC Golden State Force players